Lauri Nebel (born 11 October 1948) is an Estonian actor, singer and magician.

Filmography
Nebel has played Jakob in Metskapten (1971), Timmu the seaman in Siin me oleme (1979), Lenin No. 4 in All My Lenins (1997) and Peeter in Head käed (2001).

References

External links 

 

1948 births
Living people
Estonian male film actors
Estonian male television actors
20th-century Estonian male singers
Tallinn University alumni
Estonian Academy of Music and Theatre alumni